Trams in Paris may refer to:
 Tramways in Île-de-France
 Transport in Paris#The Tramway